Senjetak is a village in Bajestan Rural District, in the Central District of Bajestan County, Razavi Khorasan Province, Iran. At the 2006 census, its population was 50, in 13 families.

References 

Populated places in Bajestan County